Willow Lake is a census-designated place (CDP) surrounding a lake of the same name in Stephenson County, Illinois, United States.

Willow Lake was first listed as a CDP prior to the 2020 census.

Demographics

References 

Census-designated places in Stephenson County, Illinois
Census-designated places in Illinois